Pokey, Poky or Pokie may refer to:

In entertainment
 Pokey (Mario), a recurring enemy from the Super Mario series
 Pokey (Gumby character), a character from the Gumby television series
 Pokey the Penguin, a surrealistic online comic strip and its eponymous title character
 Pokey, the nickname for "Clyde", the orange ghost, in the arcade game Pac-Man
 Pokey Minch (Porky Minch), a character in the Super NES video game EarthBound (Mother 2), and the Pig King in Mother 3
 The Poky Little Puppy, a fictional character whose name is sometimes shortened to just Poky
 Poky (Yoko Tsuno), a character in comic album series Yoko Tsuno
 Poky (device), a casino gambling machine

People

Nickname
 Pokey Allen (born 1943-1996), football player and head coach
 Pokey Chatman (born 1969), Women's National Basketball Association general manager and head coach
 Pokey LaFarge (born 1983), American musician and songwriter
 Pokey Reddick (born 1964), retired National Hockey League goaltender
 Pokey Reese (born 1973), former Major League Baseball player
 Lillian Watson (born 1950), American former world record holder

Surname
 Diana Pokie, politician in Suriname
 Gregory Pokie (born 1987), footballer in Suriname - see Suriname national football team

Slang
 Pokey, a slang expression for prison
 Pokie or nipple poking, an erect nipple visible beneath clothing. Usually in the plural.
 Pokies, Australian slang for slot machines

Other uses
 POKEY, a digital I/O chip in the Atari 8-bit family of computers and many arcade games
 Any of several species of Poecilotheria, a genus of spiders
 "Pokey Award" by the Straphangers Campaign for the slowest bus route, by vehicle average miles per hour, in New York City.
 Poky, a reference distribution of the Yocto Project

Lists of people by nickname